Austin "Dink" Carroll (November 12, 1899 – April 8, 1991) was a Canadian sports journalist. A columnist for the Montréal Gazette, he won the Elmer Ferguson Memorial Award in 1984 and is a member of the media section of the Hockey Hall of Fame. He also won the Jack Graney Award in 1990 from the Canadian Baseball Hall of Fame and is a member of the Canadian Football Hall of Fame (1986). Carroll attended McGill University, where he played on the football team. He earned a LL.B. degree from there in 1923, but never practiced law. He wrote a column for the Gazette from 1941 to 1987.

References

1899 births
1991 deaths
Canadian sports journalists
Canadian Football Hall of Fame inductees
Elmer Ferguson Award winners
Journalists from Ontario
McGill University Faculty of Law alumni
Montreal Gazette people
People from Guelph